"Enough" is a song by Australian singer-songwriter Delta Goodrem, released as the third single alongside the pre-order of her fifth studio album Wings of the Wild. It features American rapper Gizzle and peaked at number 27 on the ARIA Singles Chart.

Music video
The song's accompanying music video, directed by Matt Sharp, was premiered exclusively on Facebook on 10 July and posted on Vevo the next day. The video tells the story of an artist struggling with self-doubt, painting and repainting his canvas, before creating a giant painting of a face featuring the words 'I am enough'. The story is intercut with scenes of Goodrem, Gizzle, a full band and a choir performing the song in a church.

Promotion
To promote "Enough", Goodrem performed the song with Gizzle on The Voice Australia on 2 July, Today on 4 July 2016 and The Footy Show on 6 July 2016.

Charts
"Enough" debuted at number 46 on the ARIA singles chart, before peaking at number 27, in its third week.

Weekly charts

Release history

References

2016 singles
Delta Goodrem songs
Songs written by Delta Goodrem
2016 songs
Songs written by Zac Poor
Songs written by Ameerah (singer)